The Frederick L. Darling House is a historic house located at 617 Third Street in Hudson, Wisconsin.

The two-story, Greek Revival style house was built in 1857 by Amasa and Ammah Andrews. It was added to the National Register of Historic Places on October 4, 1984.

It is a two-story L-shaped building on a stone foundation.  It has a pedimented gable portico supported by four octagonal columns on its east side.

It has also been known as Darling-O'Brien House.

References

Greek Revival houses in Wisconsin
Houses in St. Croix County, Wisconsin
Houses on the National Register of Historic Places in Wisconsin
National Register of Historic Places in St. Croix County, Wisconsin
1857 establishments in Wisconsin
Houses completed in 1857